Panagodage Don Ruchira Laksiri Perera (born 6 April 1977), commonly as Ruchira Perera is a former Sri Lankan cricketer, who played all formats. He is a left-handed batsman and a left-arm medium-fast bowler.

International career
A lively bowler, with a wrist action highly modified with the assistance of bowling coach Daryl Foster in mid-2002, he made a high-profile return against South Africa, but had lost his effectiveness. Having considered a league career in England, he once again regained his form in the English domestic leagues. He was selected for the Sri Lankan tour of New Zealand in 2006 and played one game in the series. He was also selected in the squad to tour Australia. He opened the bowling attack with Chaminda Vaas but suffered a minor injury that made him miss a few games.

He was also a member of first Twenty20 International match of Sri Lanka in 2006, when he received T20I cap no. 9.

References

1977 births
Living people
Basnahira South cricketers
Sri Lankan cricketers
Sri Lanka Test cricketers
Sri Lanka One Day International cricketers
Sri Lanka Twenty20 International cricketers
Kandurata cricketers